Fungi are considered to be in urgent need of conservation by the British Mycological Society on the grounds that it is a traditionally neglected taxon which has legal protection in few countries. Current threats to fungi include destruction of forests worldwide, fragmentation of habitat, changes in land use, pollution, anthropogenic climate change, and over-exploitation of commercially attractive species.

The Species Survival Commission of the IUCN has five specialist groups dealing with the conservation of fungi: These groups are overseen by  Cátia Canteiro, a plant and fungi specialist, at the Indianapolis Zoo’s Global Center for Species Survival (GCSS) 
 Chytrid, Zygomycete, Downy Mildew and Slime Mold Specialist Group
 Cup-fungus, Truffle and Ally Specialist Group
 Lichen Specialist Group
 Mushroom, Bracket and Puffball Specialist Group
 Rust and Smut Specialist Group

Lack of knowledge is considered a major concern with a general paucity of comprehensive checklists, even for developed nations. In addition, the criteria for "red-listing" is not specifically designed for fungi and the kinds of data required, viz. population size, lifespan, spatial distribution and population dynamics are poorly known for most fungi. As a result, in practice, indicator species are identified as target foci for the conservation of threatened fungi. The term conservation mycology was coined in a 2018 publication.

See also
 Fungi by conservation status

References

Fungus ecology
Fungi